William Rennick Boone High School is a public high school in Orlando, Florida. Built in 1952, the school is one of twenty high schools in the Orange County Public Schools system, created to accommodate the growing number of students at Orlando High School.

The plan involved building two high schools, Orlando North and Orlando South, to take the place of Orlando High School and convert the old high school facilities into what is now Howard Middle School. The last principal of Orlando High School, William R. Boone (1892-1952), died of a heart condition before the two new schools were opened, so the school board dedicated one of the high schools in his memory, then christened Orlando North as Edgewater High School after its surrounding community.

Campus
In the fall of 2005, Boone High School was rededicated, after an eight-year campus renovation process was completed. The renovation included a new media center.

Academics
For the school year 2007–2008, Boone received an "A" under the school rating system. For the 2008–2009 school year, BHS again received an A, making it the only "A" school in Orlando, and one of only two in Orange County. Boone offers several college-preparatory and technical education programs.  College bound students can participate in the Distinguished Scholars program and the Gifted program. Students seeking technical preparation can participate in programs such as drafting, early childhood education, and Tech Prep. Students can dual enroll with local community colleges and technical schools for courses specific to careers.

Academies

Magnet Programs
The school offers three magnet programs (see magnet schools), which attract students from all over Orange County. These programs (the Law Magnet, the Academy of Finance, and the Criminal Justice Academy) offer four years' worth of elective courses with an aim of preparing students for similar majors in college. All of these tracks have won awards from the county and state.

Other
Other (non-magnet) academies at Boone include the Creative Arts Academy, the Health-care Academy, and the Academy of Information Technology.

Advanced placement
Boone also offers Advanced Placement (AP) courses. Students of any year (freshman through senior) may take an AP course.

Student life

Academic
The Mock Trial Team won the State Championship in 2006.

The theatre department puts on several productions each year. In their most recent season, their productions consisted of "A Little Princess: Sara's Heart" (a world premiere), "Boys, Bois, Boyz", (another world premier) and "Chicago: The Musical". Thespian Troupe 1139 competes in local and state theater competitions. They won a total of seven "Best in Shows" as well as the "Critics Choice" acting award in this latest season at the Districts Level. In early 2009, the drama department formed an improvisation troupe, Deep Thoughts, which plays several shows a year to this day.

The Legend yearbook has received the Gold Crown from Columbia Scholastic Press Association for its 2006  and 2007 books. In 2010 Hi-lights (the school newspaper) received a Silver Crown. Both publications have been Pacemaker Finalists from National Scholastic Press Association.

Listing of academic clubs

Brave TV/News
Boone's News Report is recorded the school day before, and will reports on important opportunities, activities, and sports news to students. During the first quarter the code of conduct will be addressed on Brave Tv.

Music
The music department includes the following areas of study:

Band
 Wind Symphony
 Symphonic Band
 Concert Band
 Jazz Ensemble
 Color Guard
 Marching Band- an ensemble that is the combined forces of the Wind Symphony, Symphonic Band, Concert Band, Percussion Ensembles, and Color Guard

Chorus
 Men's Choir
 Ladies' Choir
 Belles Voix
Advanced Women
 Concert Choir
 Vocal Techniques

Orchestra
 Beginning Orchestra
 Advanced Orchestra

Piano-Keyboard
 Keyboard I
 Keyboard II, III, IV

Theory
 Music Theory
 AP Music Theory

Athletic
Boone is a member of the Orlando Metro Conference, and participates among the largest classes of the FHSAA state athletic competitions. Boone has held a rivalry with Edgewater High School since both schools opened in 1952. The schools compete in football each year in a game dubbed "The Battle for the Barrel" for a "Spirit Barrel."

Athletic teams by season

Miscellaneous organizations
Other organizations, sponsored by faculty members, exist on the reservation. Some of these bodies, like the Senior Class, Junior Class, Sophomore Class, Freshman Class, and their umbrella organization, the Student Government Association (SGA), seek to teach (by a combination of play and enculturation). Other campus groups give students a platform from which to engage in social or political activism. These clubs are Environmental Club, Gay-Straight Alliance, Social Justice Club, Key Club, Operation Smile, HAVEN, SADD (Students Against Destructive Decisions), F.C.A. (Fellowship of Christian Athletes), The Young Democrats, and the Young Republicans.

NJROTC
The school's Naval JROTC unit was formed in 1980, and won a top ranking in the nation in 1994. The unit has been to the NJROTC state finals and participates in community service, drill competitions, athletic competitions, and Color Guards. The unit also has an orienteering team and a marksmanship team. The unit was awarded most improved unit in the nation during the 2011–2012 school year.

Student body composition
Boone High School has 3,000 students and 230 faculty and staff members.  Almost one quarter of the students receive free or reduced lunch, and the population served by Exceptional Student Services is growing.  As of 2005, Boone is a magnet for the deaf/hard-of-hearing population of Orange County and provides many outreach programs to the community including the American Sign Language club.

Notable alumni
Cody Allen, pitcher for the Los Angeles Angels
Marvin Bracy, member of the United States 2016 Olympic Track Team
Ericka Dunlap, winner of the Miss America pageant in 2004
 Eric Griffin (born 1990), basketball player for Hapoel Be'er Sheva of the Israeli Basketball Premier League
Ron Karkovice, former MLB player
Stacey Mack, former American football running back for the Jacksonville Jaguars and the Houston Texans of the NFL
Mike Maroth, former MLB pitcher for the Detroit Tigers and St Louis Cardinals; current pitching coach for the Class A Florida Fire Frogs
Joe Oliver, former catcher for the Cincinnati Reds
Jason Preston, point guard for the Los Angeles Clippers
Antonio Tarver, retired boxer
Johnny Townsend, punter for the Oakland Raiders
Tommy Townsend, punter for the Kansas City Chiefs

References

External links
 Boone Crew
 School newspaper
 Athletic Association, formerly the Boone Sports Legacy Board and the Boone Boosters)
 Boone's web design
 BBC

Educational institutions established in 1952
Schools in Orlando, Florida
Orange County Public Schools
High schools in Orange County, Florida
Public high schools in Florida
Magnet schools in Florida
1952 establishments in Florida